Kakaydi is an urban-type settlement in Surxondaryo Region, Uzbekistan. It is part of Jarqoʻrgʻon District. The town population in 2002 was 6,500 people.

References

Populated places in Surxondaryo Region
Urban-type settlements in Uzbekistan